Shadow of the Cobra is a 1989 television miniseries based on the book The Life and Crimes of Charles Sobhraj by Richard Neville and Julie Clarke.

References

External links
Shadow of the Cobra at IMDb

1980s Australian television miniseries
1989 Australian television series debuts
1989 Australian television series endings
1980s television miniseries
Films scored by Chris Neal (songwriter)
Films directed by Mark Joffe